Karl Fuchs was an ethnic German from Kazan in Tatarstan. He founded the Kazan Zoo in 1806, as well as the Botanical Museum in Kazan. He served as the Rector of Kazan University from 1823 - 1827.

References

External links
 http://newkazan.blogspot.com
 http://www.ksu.ru/eng/general/museums.htm
 http://www.ndrt.ru/fuks/topart.php?lang=de 
 https://web.archive.org/web/20071027075916/http://braunschweig.de/staedtepartnerschaften/akt_01_02.html
 https://web.archive.org/web/20081006005254/http://www.mandolinengruppe-schwalmstadt.de/presse/presse.htm

Scientists from Kazan
Russian and Soviet-German people
Academic staff of Kazan Federal University
Russian botanists
Russian zoologists